George Russell (August 1869 – 1930) was a Scottish footballer who played in the Football League for Aston Villa with whom he played in and won the 1895 FA Cup Final.

References

1869 births
1930 deaths
Scottish footballers
English Football League players
Association football midfielders
Ayr F.C. players
Aston Villa F.C. players